The Boar is a 1998 novel written by American author Joe R. Lansdale, set in East Texas in 1933 during the Great Depression.

Plot summary
The story is about young Richard Dale and his family who wind up terrorized by an extremely large wild boar. Richard and his brother Ike venture into the river bottoms in search of the boar they name Old Satan. Hunting an animal this size proves to be dangerous and as the story unfolds Richard finds himself taking bigger risks as he ventures deeper and deeper into the deep woods of the Big Thicket.

Editions
This book was first published by Subterranean Press as a limited edition in November 1998. It was reissued as a trade hardcover in 2005 by Night Shade Books. The limited edition is out of print.

References

External links
Author's Official Website
Publisher's Website

Novels by Joe R. Lansdale
Great Depression novels
Novels set in Texas
Fiction set in 1933
American mystery novels
Works by Joe R. Lansdale
1998 American novels
Subterranean Press books